Blue heron may refer to:

Birds
 Great blue heron, a large wading bird
 Little blue heron, a small heron

Locations
 Blue Heron Airport, a privately owned public-use airport in Schoharie County, New York, United States
 Blue Heron, Kentucky, United States
 Blue Heron Lake, Canada
 Blue Heron Park Preserve, New York City, New York, United States
 Great Blue Heron Casino, Canada
 The Blue Heron Lodge of the Tidewater Council of the Boy Scouts of America

Music
 Blue Heron (vocal ensemble), a professional vocal ensemble based in the Boston area
 The Great Blue Heron Music Festival

Other
 Blue Heron Powered Parachutes, an American brand of aircraft
 RV Blue Heron, a research vessel in the United States.

See also